Cinderella is a 2015 romantic fantasy film directed by Kenneth Branagh, from a screenplay by Chris Weitz, and co-produced by Walt Disney Pictures, Kinberg Genre, Allison Shearmur Productions, and Beagle Pug Films. The film is based on the folk tale and is a live-action adaptation of Walt Disney's 1950 animated film of the same name. It stars Lily James as the title character, alongside Cate Blanchett, Richard Madden, Holliday Grainger, and Helena Bonham Carter.

Development for a live-action reimagining of the original animated film began in May 2010, with producer Simon Kinberg attached to the project. In late January 2013, Branagh signed on to direct, with Weitz hired to revise a script from Aline Brosh McKenna. In November 2012, casting began with Blanchett being the first to sign on; James was eventually cast in the titular role in April 2013. Principal photography began at Pinewood Studios in Buckinghamshire, England on September 23, 2013, and wrapped on December 14.

Cinderella premiered at the 65th Berlin International Film Festival on February 13, 2015, and was released theatrically in the United States on March 13, 2015, and in the United Kingdom on March 27 in standard and IMAX formats by Walt Disney Studios Motion Pictures. It grossed over $542 million worldwide, becoming Branagh's highest-grossing film to date as a director. The film received positive reviews from critics, and was nominated for costume design categories at the 88th Academy Awards, 21st Critics' Choice Awards, and 69th British Academy Film Awards.

Plot

Ella, a kind-hearted daughter of a wealthy merchant, lives happily with her parents, until her mother falls ill and dies. On her deathbed, she asks her daughter to always have courage and be kind. Years later, Ella's father marries the widowed Lady Tremaine, who, along with her own two daughters, Drisella and Anastasia, moves into his house. When he leaves on business, Lady Tremaine reveals her cruel and jealous nature, forcing Ella to give up her bedroom to the stepsisters and move into the attic. During his trip, Ella's father unexpectedly dies, and Lady Tremaine dismisses the household staff to save money, forcing all the chores upon her stepdaughter. Seeing her face covered in cinders after sleeping by the fireplace, Ella's stepfamily mockingly dubs her "Cinderella".

Distraught by her stepfamily's mistreatment of her, Ella rides off into the woods, where she meets Kit, the crown prince, who introduces himself as a palace apprentice. They take a liking to each other, but part without him learning her name. Later, hoping to see Ella again, Kit persuades his terminally ill father, who urges him to marry a princess, to invite all the inhabitants of the kingdom, including every eligible maiden, to the upcoming royal ball.

On the night of the ball, Ella, also wanting to meet Kit again, attempts to join her stepfamily, but they ruin her dress and leave her behind. Running into the garden in tears, Ella meets an old beggar woman, who reveals herself to be her fairy godmother, and magically transforms a pumpkin into a carriage, mice into horses, lizards into footmen, and a goose into the coachman. She then turns Ella's ripped dress into a ball gown, and gives her a pair of glass slippers. As Ella departs, the Fairy Godmother warns her the magic will end at the last stroke of midnight, and casts a final spell to prevent Ella's stepfamily from recognizing her.

At the ball, Kit is delighted to see Ella and gives her the first dance, to the displeasure of the Grand Duke, who wants him to marry Princess Chelina of Zaragoza for political reasons. Although surprised at his true identity, Ella bonds with Kit, but before she can tell him her name, the clock chimes midnight and she flees the palace, losing one of her glass slippers. The Grand Duke pursues her, but Ella manages to break away right before the magic dissipates. Upon returning home, she hides the remaining glass slipper under the floorboards.

Soon the King dies, but before that he allows Kit to marry Ella. As the new king, Kit issues a proclamation professing his love for the “mystery princess” and requests she present herself. Ella hurries to retrieve the slipper to prove her identity, but Lady Tremaine finds it first and attempts to blackmail Ella into making her a head of the royal household after marrying Kit in exchange. After Ella refuses, Lady Tremaine locks her in the attic and breaks the slipper, bringing its remains to the Grand Duke and revealing the truth to him. He agrees to make Lady Tremaine a countess and secure advantageous marriages for her daughters if she keeps Ella hidden forever.

Unaware of these developments, Kit orders the Grand Duke and the Captain of the Guard to find the “mystery princess” by trying the intact slipper on every woman in the kingdom. At Tremaine's house, the shoe fits neither stepsister, and the company prepares to depart until they hear Ella singing in the attic. Kit, who has secretly accompanied the group, commands the Captain to investigate, forcing Lady Tremaine to release her. Ella successfully tries on the slipper and, as she leaves with Kit, forgives her stepmother. Soon after, Lady Tremaine, her daughters, and the Grand Duke leave the kingdom permanently, while Ella and Kit marry and become its most beloved monarchs, ruling with the same courage and kindness that she had promised her mother years ago.

Cast
 Lily James as Ella, also known as Cinderella, a strong-willed and kind-hearted young woman who is forced to become a maidservant in her own house by her stepfamily. James was announced to have been cast on April 30, 2013. According to Kenneth Branagh, "hundreds and hundreds of girls" auditioned for the part, with actresses such as Saoirse Ronan, Alicia Vikander, Gabriella Wilde, Bella Heathcote, and Margot Robbie also being considered. Emma Watson was in early talks to play the role, but a deal ultimately did not work out. Amanda Seyfried was also rumored to be considered for the part. James originally auditioned for the role of Anastasia, but the casting director suggested that she try out for Cinderella. James described her character as a "kind, good person that is able to be happy in a cruel environment, and that is her superpower… I think we have to, to get through life, which can throw us off. I think what’s amazing about Ella is that she’s the best version of herself, at all times. That’s what remarkable about her."
 Eloise Webb as 10-year-old Ella
 Richard Madden as Prince Kit, a humble and noble soon-to-be king who falls in love with Ella, despite his duty to marry the princess for the good of his kingdom. Madden was announced to have been cast on May 8, 2013.
 Cate Blanchett as Lady Tremaine, Ella's bitter and broken stepmother, who despises her stepdaughter for her unbreakable spirit and kindness. Blanchett was announced to have been cast on November 27, 2012. Blanchett described her character as a "woman who has tried to start her life again, and becomes intensely jealous of the deep affection that her new husband has for his daughter, Cinderella. She's not as beautiful and not as kind and as good as Cinderella. When Cinderella's father dies, the financial pressures, the panic and the jealousy grow… that is what makes her wicked."
 Helena Bonham Carter as the Fairy Godmother, a ditzy yet caring sorceress who helps Ella get to the ball. She also serves as the film's narrator. Bonham Carter was announced to have been cast on June 20, 2013. According to Simon Kinberg, she was the first choice for the role.
 Nonso Anozie as the Captain, Kit's sarcastic yet loyal best friend and confidant.
 Stellan Skarsgård as the Grand Duke, a shady and calculating royal functionary who seeks the prosperity of the kingdom through questionable actions.
 Sophie McShera as Drisella Tremaine
 Holliday Grainger as Anastasia Tremaine
 Derek Jacobi as the King, Kit's strict yet loving father, who passed away near the end of the film.
 Ben Chaplin as Ella's father
 Hayley Atwell as Ella's mother
 Rob Brydon as Master Phineus
 Jana Pérez as Princess Chelina of Zaragoza
 Alex Macqueen as Royal Crier
 Tom Edden as Lizard Footman
 Josh O'Connor as Ballroom Palace Guard

Production

Development
In May 2010, following the box office success of Tim Burton's Alice in Wonderland, Walt Disney Pictures began developing a live-action reimagining of Charles Perrault's fairy tale "Cinderella", making a seven-figure pitch deal with Aline Brosh McKenna and Simon Kinberg. According to Sean Bailey, studio chairman Alan F. Horn wanted to make the film a "definitive Cinderella for generations to come," and told him that if he needed to "spend a little more, spend it, to make sure it's one for the time capsule." McKenna's initial drafts suggested a "swashbuckling" take on the story, with the prince being groomed for a politically arranged marriage until he meets Cinderella, recast as a knight, whom McKenna described as a "somebody who’s learning to go after what she wants. Basically, she gets separated from the prince and has to find her way back to him, but it’s more complicated than that. She’s very active and independent." However, the idea was discarded due to the studio striving for a more "recognizable" approach to the story. In August 2011, Mark Romanek was hired to direct the film, and Chris Weitz was brought on to revise McKenna's script in February 2012. Romanek supervised the development for fifteen months, but in January 2013, he left the project due to creative differences with Disney, as his version was darker than the studio wanted. Later that month, Disney negotiated with Kenneth Branagh to take over as director.

Costumes
Three-time Oscar-winning costume designer Sandy Powell was in charge of the costumes for the film. Powell began working on concepts for the characters' looks almost two years before principal photography began in the summer of 2013. Powell said she was aiming for the look of "a nineteenth-century period film made in the 1940s or 1950s."

For the Fairy Godmother, Powell took a major departure from the animated film of the 1950s, instead giving actress Helena Bonham Carter an opulent white ballgown, featuring fairy wings, puff sleeves and a very full skirt. The skirt also had battery lights underneath it, which Carter said caused issues when filming scenes as the batteries would run low quite quickly.
For the stepmother and stepsisters, Powell had a very clear idea about the look; "They are meant to be totally ridiculous on the outside—a bit too much and overdone—and ugly on the inside." The silhouette of the prince came from the original animation, however she created a more fitted look and less masculine colours. Some of the prince costumes were dyed to accentuate Madden's eyes.

The ball gown was inspired by the Disney animated film in its color and shape; "The gown had to look lovely when she dances and runs away from the ball. I wanted her to look like she was floating, like a watercolour painting." The dress was made with more than a dozen fine layers of fabric, a corset and a petticoat. Nine versions of the Cinderella gown were designed, each with more than 270 yards of fabric and 10,000 crystals. It took 18 tailors and 500 hours to make each dress.

The wedding dress was another difficult project. "Creating the wedding dress was a challenge. Rather than try to make something even better than the ball gown, I had to do something completely different and simple... I wanted the whole effect to be ephemeral and fine, so we went with an extreme-lined shaped bodice with a long train," said Powell. It took 16 people and 550 hours to complete the silk-organza, hand-painted dress. While the crew photographed James in the gown, the actress stood too close to an electric heater and the dress caught on fire; the top layer of the dress had to be redone because only one wedding dress was created due to time and budget constraints.

For the glass slipper, Powell took inspiration from a 1950s shoe she saw in a museum. Since glass does not sparkle, they decided to use crystal instead. Swarovski partnered with Disney to make the famous shoe. Powell went directly to Swarovski headquarters in Austria to meet the product developers. It took 6 digital renderings of the shoes until they found the right one for the film. Swarovski made eight pairs of crystal shoes for the film, though none were actually wearable. Consequently, the leather shoes James wore on set had to be digitally altered into crystal. Alongside the slipper, Swarovski provided more than 7 million crystals that were used in costumes and 100 tiaras for the ball scene.

Filming
Principal photography on Cinderella began on September 23, 2013. The film was shot at Pinewood Studios in Buckinghamshire, England, and at various other locations including Hampton Court Palace, Blenheim Palace, Windsor Castle, Cliveden, Old Royal Naval College, and Black Park. Although the royal palace is mainly computer-generated, it was modeled after the Zwinger in Dresden, Germany.

Post-production
Post-production began in December 2013, and was completed in August 2014. The finished film was rated PG for "mild thematic elements" by the Motion Picture Association of America. In the United Kingdom, the film received a U classification for 'very mild scenes of emotional upset' by the British Board of Film Classification.

Music

On June 7, 2013, news confirmed that composer Patrick Doyle would score the film, with the music having an emphasis on romance. Doyle has previously scored several Branagh films, including Hamlet and Thor. He has also scored the Disney·Pixar computer-animated fantasy-comedy film Brave. Doyle recorded the film's score with the London Symphony Orchestra conducted by James Shearman at the Air Lyndhurst Studios in London.

The soundtrack debuted at No. 60 on the Billboard 200, selling 8,000 copies in its first week.

Marketing 
The first official presentation of the film occurred at Disney's three-day D23 Expo in August 2013. The film was previewed at CinemaCon in Las Vegas, Nevada, in March 2014, with a teaser showing Cinderella hearing about her father's death, meeting the prince while riding through the forest, her mother's ball gown being torn apart by her step-family, and a comedic section where the Fairy Godmother transforms a pumpkin into a carriage.

The first official trailer debuted on May 15, 2014. In the minute-long teaser, which doesn't include any footage from the film, a sparkling glass slipper is slowly revealed over a black background. The second official trailer – two-and-a-half minutes long and containing footage from the film – debuted on Good Morning America on November 19, 2014, with a 15-second trailer preview released two days prior. In its first 24 hours of release, the trailer was viewed 4.2 million times on YouTube and 33 million times on Facebook, the highest views among all Disney films in history, except for Marvel Studios releases. The movie's official poster was also released on November 19, featuring James as Cinderella and photographed by Annie Leibovitz. Disney released an international trailer on December 16, 2014. A new trailer was released on January 1, 2015. On February 11, 2015, Disney released a final trailer for the film.

Novelization
A tie-in novelization of the film written by Elizabeth Rudnick was published by Disney Publishing Worldwide on January 27, 2015.

Release

Theatrical 
The film had its world premiere on February 13, 2015, at the 65th Berlin International Film Festival, and was released on March 13, 2015. Theatrically, it was accompanied by Walt Disney Animation Studios' short film Frozen Fever, featuring the characters from Frozen. On February 10, 2015, IMAX Corporation and Disney announced plans to digitally re-master the film into the IMAX format and release it in IMAX theaters globally on the scheduled release date.

In September 2020, the film returned to theaters in the United Kingdom following their reopening from closure due to the COVID-19 pandemic.

Home media
Walt Disney Studios Home Entertainment released Cinderella on Blu-ray combo pack, Digital HD, DVD, and "Disney Movies Anywhere" on September 15, 2015. Blu-ray bonus features include an alternate opening, the Frozen Fever short, and the featurettes: "Staging The Ball", "Ella's Furry Friends", "A Fairy Tale Comes to Life", and "Costume Test Fun". Five deleted scenes with an introduction by Kenneth Branagh are included exclusively on Disney Movies Anywhere. The film debuted in second place on the home media sales charts behind Furious 7. Cinderella was released on 4K Blu-ray on June 25, 2019.

In October 2014, a licensing agreement between Disney and Turner Broadcasting was announced, in which Cinderella would premiere across Turner's cable network portfolio (including TBS and TNT) in the Spring of 2017. The film had its network television premiere on TBS on August 13, 2017. The film aired on ABC’s Wonderful World of Disney programming block on January 19, 2021.

Reception

Box office
Cinderella grossed $201.2 million in the U.S. and Canada, and $341.2 million in other countries, for a worldwide total of $542.4 million against a budget of $95 million. It is the twelfth highest-grossing film of 2015 in any genre. The film had a worldwide opening of $132 million, and an IMAX opening of $9 million. Deadline Hollywood calculated the net profit of the film to be $164.77 million, when factoring together all expenses and revenues for the film.

In the U.S. and Canada, Cinderella opened on Friday, March 13, 2015, across 3,845 theaters, and earned $23 million. The film's Friday gross included a $2.3 million late night run. It topped the box office during its opening weekend as projected, earning $67.9 million, including a record $5 million from 358 IMAX theaters, and became Disney's biggest 2D PG-rated opening of all time. It is director Kenneth Branagh's biggest opening of his career (breaking 2011's Thor record), the fourth-highest Disney opening in March, and was the seventh-highest opening in March overall (not counting for inflation). Audiences during its opening weekend comprised 66% female, 66% families, 26% adults, 8% teenagers, 31% under the age of 12 and 9% 50 years and older. Cinderella finished its first week at the box office with $87.55 million, which was very high end of the film's lofty pre-release expectations. In its second weekend, the film declined 49% to $35 million and was surpassed by The Divergent Series: Insurgent, dropping to #2. The drop was in between two of Disney's previous live-action fantasy films, Oz the Great and Powerful (48%) and Maleficent (51%). In North America, Cinderella is the ninth highest-grossing 2015 film.

Outside North America, box office analysts predicted as much as $60 million opening. The film made its debut outside of North America on the same weekend as its wide North American release and earned an estimated $62.4 million from 31 countries, including $4 million from IMAX theaters. It topped the box office for two non-consecutive weekends. It opened in China with $25 million, the biggest March opening in the country, and Russia with $7.3 million. The opening in these two countries were considered impressive given that both the countries are famous for their keenness for 3D films rather than 2D. Other high openings occurred in the UK, Ireland and Malta ($5.6 million), Mexico ($5 million), Japan ($4.8 million), France ($3.3 million), and Brazil ($3.7 million). In Australia, where the release date was coinciding with the Cricket World Cup finale, it managed to open with $3.4 million. Italy opened with $4.6 million and topped the box office for three consecutive weekends. It also topped the Japanese box office for five consecutive weekends. It became the second-highest grossing Disney live-action film in China, behind Pirates of the Caribbean: On Stranger Tides and in the Philippines, behind Maleficent. In total earnings, its largest markets outside of the US and Canada are China ($71.1 million), Japan ($46 million) and the UK, Ireland and Malta ($29.2 million).

Critical response
Cinderella received positive reviews from critics. On review aggregator website Rotten Tomatoes, the film holds an 84% approval rating based on 256 reviews, with a rating average of 7.20/10. The site's critical consensus reads, "Refreshingly traditional in a revisionist era, Kenneth Branagh's Cinderella proves Disney hasn't lost any of its old-fashioned magic." Metacritic assigned the film a weighted average score of 67 out of 100, based on 47 critics, indicating "generally favorable reviews". Audiences polled by CinemaScore gave the film a grade of "A" on an A+ to F scale.

David Rooney of The Hollywood Reporter reviewed the film at the Berlin Film Festival and praised the special effects, the screenplay, and Blanchett's performance and said that "anyone nostalgic for childhood dreams of transformation will find something to enjoy in an uplifting movie that invests warm sentiment in universal themes of loss and resilience, experience and maturity." Peter Debruge of Variety said, "It's all a bit square, big on charm, but lacking the crackle of Enchanted or The Princess Bride. But though this Cinderella could never replace Disney's animated classic, it's no ugly stepsister either, but a deserving companion." Guy Lodge of The Guardian gave the film three stars out of five and said, "While it might have been nice to see the new-model Cinderella follow Frozens progressive, quasi-feminist lead, the film's naff, preserved-in-amber romanticism is its very charm." Scott Mendelson of Forbes admired the film's visual effects, production design, and deemed the costume design Oscar-worthy, adding, "with an emphasis on empathy and empowerment, Walt Disney's Cinderella is the best film yet in their 'turn our animated classics into live-action blockbuster' subgenre."

Richard Corliss of Time magazine said Branagh's Cinderella successfully updates and revitalizes Disney's "ill-conceived" animated film, and praised the empowered Ella, the visuals, and Blanchett's performance. Katy Waldman of Slate similarly deemed the film a commendable and authentic upgrade that does not undermine its heroine while maintaining its classic splendor and charm. Joe Morgenstern of The Wall Street Journal commended James' and Blanchett's performances, the sets, costumes and minimal digital effects, as well as Branagh's direction, stating he "set a tone of lushly sustainable fantasy that's often affecting, frequently witty, seldom cloying, nearly free of self-comment and entirely free of irony." Likewise, Claudia Puig of USA Today complimented the performances along with Branagh and screenwriter Chris Weitz for "ground[ing] this romantic tale with sincerity amid the dazzle." Los Angeles Times Betsy Sharkey praised Blanchett's and James' performances and described the film as a "poetically, if not prophetically, imagined storybook fable" that succeeds because of its earnestness, humor, its lack of modern-day pretenses, and Branagh's "singular focus". Lawrence Toppman of The Charlotte Observer proclaimed, "This version has more psychological depth than usual and answers questions we may always have had. Branagh's Cinderella does something extraordinarily rare among fairy-tale adaptations: It leaves out nothing we want and adds nothing we don't." Noting the religious themes and symbols of the film, cultural commentator Fr. Robert Barron writes that due to Branagh's traditional telling of the story, "he actually allows the spiritual – indeed specifically Christian – character of the tale to emerge."

The film was ranked #1 on TheWraps list of "Every Disney Live-Action Remake of an Animated Classic Ranked, Worst to Best", #2 in Varietys list of "Disney's Live-Action Remakes Ranked From '101 Dalmatians' to 'Mulan'", and #3 on the Rotten Tomatoes list of "All 14 Disney Live-Action Remakes Ranked".

Accolades

Impact
After the release and success of Cinderella, along with Alice in Wonderland, Maleficent, The Jungle Book, Beauty and the Beast, Christopher Robin, Aladdin, The Lion King, Lady and the Tramp, Mulan, Cruella, and Pinocchio , Walt Disney Pictures has announced the development of several other live-action remakes from their Animated Classics series. Since the releases of these ten films, Disney has announced the development of live-action adaptations of The Sword in the Stone, The Black Cauldron, Peter Pan, The Little Mermaid, Snow White and the Seven Dwarfs, Lilo & Stitch, The Hunchback of Notre Dame, Bambi, Robin Hood, Hercules, the Tinker Bell series, and The Aristocats. The company also had plans for live-action spin-offs of Fantasia and Snow White and the Seven Dwarfs along with a live-action prequel to Aladdin, but those projects were scrapped for unknown reasons.

References

External links

2015 films
2010s romantic fantasy films
Remakes of American films
American romantic fantasy films
British romantic fantasy films
Cinderella (franchise)
2010s English-language films
Films about fairies and sprites
Films about interclass romance
Films about princesses
Films about royalty
Films about weddings
Films about wish fulfillment
Films based on adaptations
Films based on Charles Perrault's Cinderella
Films based on multiple works
Films directed by Kenneth Branagh
Films produced by David Barron
Films produced by Simon Kinberg
Films scored by Patrick Doyle
Films set in the 19th century
Films shot at Pinewood Studios
Films shot in London
Films shot in Quebec
Films with screenplays by Chris Weitz
IMAX films
Live-action films based on Disney's animated films
Walt Disney Pictures films
2010s American films
2010s British films